The decapod (crustaceans such as a crab, lobster, shrimp or prawn) is made up of 20 body segments grouped into two main body parts: the cephalothorax and the pleon (abdomen). Each segment may possess one pair of appendages, although in various groups these may be reduced or missing. They are, from head to tail:

Cephalothorax

Head
antennules
antennae
mandibles
first maxillae
second maxillae
The head also bears the (usually stalked) compound eyes. The distal portion of a mandible or maxilla which has a sensory function is known as a palp.

Thorax / pereon
first maxillipeds
second maxillipeds
third maxillipeds
first pereiopods
second pereiopods
third pereiopods
fourth pereiopods
fifth pereiopods

Maxillipeds are appendages modified to function as mouthparts. Particularly in the less advanced decapods, these can be very similar to the pereiopods. Pereiopods are primarily walking legs and are also used for gathering food. They are also the ten legs from which decapods take their name. Those pereiopods which are armed with a claw (chela) may be referred to as chelipeds. The moveable fingers of a claw are known as dactyls. The pereiopods bear the sexual organs, which are the third pereiopod in the female and the fifth pereiopod in the male. Each appendage from the second maxilla to the fifth pereiopod also bears a gill. In the Anomura (hermit crabs and related animals), the fifth pair of pereiopods is often hidden inside the branchial chamber, where they are used to clean the gills. The cephalothorax is covered by a carapace which protects the internal organs and the gills; the section of the carapace that projects in front of the eyes is called the rostrum.

Abdomen / pleon

first pleopods
second pleopods
third pleopods
fourth pleopods
fifth pleopods
uropods

Pleopods (also called swimmerets) are primarily swimming legs, and are also used for brooding the eggs (except in prawns), catching food (then swept to the mouth), and can sometimes bear their own gills. In some taxa, the first one or two pairs of pleopods are specialised in the males for fertilisation, and are referred to as the gonopods.

Telson
At the end of the pleon is the tail fan, comprising a pair of biramous uropods and the telson, which bears the anus. Together, they are used for steering while swimming, and in the caridoid escape reaction.

In crabs and some other carcinised decapods, the abdomen is folded under the cephalothorax.

See also
 Arthropod leg

References

Crustacean anatomy
Decapods